Dane Lovett (born 1984) is an artist from Brisbane, Australia. In 2007 the artist moved to Melbourne to complete honours in painting at the Victorian College of the Arts.

Exhibitions
In 2011 Dane Lovett was included in the group show "Explaining Colours to the Blind" at Tristian Koenig, exhibited solo at Colette in Paris and received a grant from the Australia Council for the Arts to undertake a studio residency in Tokyo for three months.

Representation

Dane Lovett is represented by Tristian Koenig in Melbourne and Sullivan + Strumpf Fine Art in Sydney.

See also
Arts in Australia

References

External links 
 

Australian illustrators
1984 births
Living people
Album-cover and concert-poster artists
Artists from Brisbane